Rosamond Bowditch Loring  (May 2, 1889 – September 17, 1950) was an author, bookbinder, and creator, collector and historian of decorated papers. She was active in publishing circles as well as craft organizations.
Her collection of historic and modern papers, now housed at Harvard University, is still used by librarians, book publishers, collectors, and researchers.

Education in craft
Loring studied bookbinding at the Sears School of Bookbinding in Boston's Back Bay. Having difficulty finding high quality decorated paper for use in binding, she turned to making her own, setting up a studio on the top floor of her home and experimenting based on a scrap of information about paste paper gleaned from Joseph Zaehnsdorf's The Art of Bookbinding. She later said, "It sounded so simple, until it came to making them". As she gained experience, she shared her knowledge by lecturing and demonstrating the craft. At one demonstration of marbling in 1928, an observer said, "I like what you do, Mrs. Loring, but you don't do it right!". The critic was Charles V. Saflund, a professional marbler, who came to her studio to give lessons about making marbled and paste papers.

Commercial work
Loring first sold her decorated papers to students at the bookbinding school. She began to receive requests from local publishers, many of whom were family friends; her husband, Gus Loring, was a director of Riverside Press, printers for the Houghton Mifflin publishing company.

Her first large commission was an order for paper to cover 550 copies of The Antigone of Sophocles, translated by John Jay Chapman and printed by Riverside Press in 1930.

Loring's largest project was The Brothers Karamazov by Fyodor Dostoyevsky, printed in an edition of 1,500 by the Merrymount Press for the Limited Editions Club in 1933. The novel was issued in three volumes, requiring paper for 4,500 books. She spent almost three months churning out 25.5 x 40 inch sheets in three separate colors.

Most of Loring's commercial output was destined for smaller editions of books published by Merrymount Press, the Limited Editions Club, the Club of Odd Volumes, and the Anthoensen Press in Portland, Maine. In 1933, she proposed charging 15 cents for a 25.5 by 40 inch sheet of paste paper. By 1942, prices had risen to 4550 cents for a sheet of roller-printed paper. This type of paper covered the Merrymount Press 1934 edition of Charles Dickens's A Christmas Carol. Loring cut out tree shapes from pieces of rubber and glued them to a rolling pin which she used to create a repeating design in the paste.

Collecting
Loring began collecting marbled paper but soon, realizing the importance of paste and printed papers in bookbinding, began to collect those as well. She preferred older examples but also collected contemporary printed endpapers. Writing to fellow collector , she said: 

She purchased paper and traded with other collectors and friends in the book trade, including Hirsch, Dard Hunter, Philip Hofer and Daniel Berkeley Updike. She traveled to Europe in 1937, visiting the Hirschs, the Cockerell bindery and the Victoria & Albert Museum in England, studying museum collections and buying papers for her own.

Loring organized the papers by category: Paste, Marble, Early Printed, Modern Printed, Douglas Cockerell, Oriental, her own papers, book covers, Ingeborg Börjesson, W.C. Doebbelin, and Modern Pictorial Endpapers.

Clubs and volunteer activity
Loring joined the Boston Society of Arts and Crafts in 1921 as an associate member. She was elected a Craftsman member the next year and was promoted to mastership as a "Designer (marbled papers)" in 1934.

In 1927, Loring and Mrs. Goddard M. White founded the Book-in-Hand Guild to recognize the work of women in bookbinding. 

Gus Loring joined the Club of Odd Volumes in 1932, becoming President in 1942. His wife was the club's Assistant Librarian from 1936 to 1949. Women were not allowed to become members but she "quietly did all of the hard work in connection with the Club's exhibitions".  

The Lorings were also active supporters of the Peabody Museum in Salem, Massachusetts. They both served on the board (Gus was President from 1942 to 1951) and Rosamond was appointed Honorary Curator of Exhibitions in 1942, where she "ably and unobtrusively filled the places of those absent upon military service".

Loring joined the Hroswitha Club, a group of women bibliophiles based in New York City, in 1944.

Personal life
Loring was a great-granddaughter of Nathaniel Bowditch; her parents were Alfred Bowditch and Mary Louise Rice. She was born and raised at "Moss Hill", her family's estate in Jamaica Plain, a Boston neighborhood, where she married Augustus Peabody Loring, Jr. (1885–1951) on June 22, 1911. The couple had five daughters and two sons. For the first eight years of their marriage, they lived year-round in Prides Crossing on the North Shore of Massachusetts. In 1919, they moved to the Back Bay, Boston, spending winters there and summers in Prides Crossing, for the rest of their lives.

Legacy
In 1948, Loring became Honorary Curator of the Paper Collection in the Department of Graphic Arts of the Harvard College Library. She promised to leave her collection to Harvard and established the Rosamond B. Loring Fund for its maintenance and expansion. Shortly after her death, exhibitions of her papers, books and tools were held at the Boston Athenæum and the Boston University library.

Between 2003 and 2007, the staff at Harvard's Houghton Library, where Loring's collections are held, reorganized and cataloged them, making finding aids available on the internet.
 Contains over 10,000 samples.

Bibliography

Gallery

Further reading

Notes and references

Notes

References

1889 births
1950 deaths
Bookbinders
Papermakers
People from Jamaica Plain
Women in craft